The Improved Order of Red Men is a fraternal organization established in North America in 1834. It claims direct descent from the colonial era Sons of Liberty. Their rituals and regalia are modeled after those assumed by men of the era to be used by Native Americans. Despite the name, the order was formed solely by, and for, white men. This whites-only rule was part of their bylaws until 1974, when the all-white clause was eliminated. Their current position is that they are now open to people of all ethnic backgrounds. In 1935 the organization claimed a membership of about half a million, but has since declined to a little more than 15,000.

History 
On December 16, 1773, a group of colonists — all men, and members of the Sons of Liberty — met in Boston to protest the tax on tea imposed by England. When their protest went unheeded, they disguised themselves as their idea of Mohawk people, proceeded to Boston harbor, and dumped overboard 342 chests of English tea. (See Boston Tea Party.)

In the late 18th century, the Tammany Societies, named after Tamanend, were formed. The most well-known of these was New York City's Society of St. Tammany, which grew into a major political machine known as "Tammany Hall."

For the next 35 years, the original Sons of Liberty and the Sons of St. Tamina groups went their own way, under many different names.

Around 1813, a disenchanted group created the philanthropic "Society of Red Men" at historic Fort Mifflin in Philadelphia.

The organization grew in the 1820s. Parallel lines of advancement were offered in the Order of Red Men: a series of military titles and a set of “Indian rankings.”

Class and ethnic differences introduced by new immigrants, anti-Masonic persecutions, attacks on fraternal groups based on excessive drinking, and, ultimately, a wide-spread cholera epidemic in 1832 led to the decline of the organization.

In 1834, the Improved Order of Red Men (IORM) was started as a revival in Baltimore. It was focused on temperance, patriotism and American History. In 1835, with only two groups in place (called "tribes" by the IORM), a larger IORM was organized. Unlike the original Order, the IORM uses only expanded Native American titles. Rather than the public display of Native American costumes, the IORM uses its regalia in private gatherings.

In 1886, its membership requirements were defined in the same pseudo-Indigenous phrasing as the rest of the constitution:

In one 1886 "tribe", a member's 12 cent a week dues went into a fund which was used to pay disability benefits to members at a rate of about "three fathoms per seven suns" ($3/week) for up to "six moons" (6 months) and then two dollars a week. Some medical care ("a suitable nurse") was available, and also a death benefit of one hundred dollars. The fund was invested in bonds, mortgages, and "Building Association Stock". Meetings were held weekly on Friday nights.

Organization 
The Order has a three tiered structure. Local units are called "tribes" and are presided over by a "Sachem" and a board of directors. Local meeting sites are called "Wigwams". The state level is called the "Reservation" and governed by a "Great Sachem" and "Great Council" or "Board of Chiefs". The national level is the "Great Council of the United States". The Great Council consists of the "Great Incohonee" (president), and a "Board of Great Chiefs", which includes the "Great Senior Sagamore" (first vice-president), "Great Junior Sagamore", "Great Chief of Records" (secretary), "Great Keeper of the Wampum" (treasurer) and "Prophet" (past president). The headquarters of the Order has been in Waco, Texas, since at least 1979. They maintain an official museum and library in Waco.

Auxiliaries and side degrees 
A side degree of the order was founded in 1890 as the National Haymakers' Association. There was also once a uniformed division called the Knights of Tammany, as well as a group called the Chieftains League, which consisted of members who had been exalted to the Chief Degree (see below) and were in good standing within their respective "tribes".

In 1952, the Order created the Degree of Hiawatha, as a youth auxiliary for males 8 and up. Most of the members of the Degree of Hiawatha were concentrated in New England. In 1979 there were less than 5,000 members in approximately 125 "Councils".

The Order female auxiliary is the Degree of Pocahontas and dates to the 1880s and the Degree of Anona, a junior order of the Degree of Pocahontas, was formed in 1952.

Membership 
The Improved Order of the Red Men grew in membership in the late 19th century. It reached 519,942 members in forty-six states in 1921, but had declined to 31,789 in 32 states in 1978 and to 15,251 by 2011.

Until 1974, the Order was open to whites only. That year the 106th Great Council of the United States eliminated the all-white clause in what was called a "turning point for the order". In the present-day, the Improved Order of Red Men is open to people of all ethnic backgrounds.

Rituals 
The order itself claims direct descent from the Sons of Liberty, noting that the Sons participated in the Boston Tea Party dressed as their idea of "Indians". Thus, they continue to dress as "Indians" and use Native American terminology, despite being a non-Native organization.

The group's ritual terminology is derived from language they believe is used by Native Americans, though it also shows the influence of Freemasonry. Outsiders are called "Palefaces", to open a meeting is called "kindling the fire", officers' installations are called "Raising up of Chiefs" and voting is called "twigging". The Masonic influence is seen in the three basic degrees – Adoption, Warrior and Chief. There is also a fourth degree, Beneficiary, for insurance.

Calendar system
Originally, the society used the Hebrew Anno Mundi system for calendar year numbering when dating their documents, rather than AD (note: the Redmen did not use the Common Era reference); however, in CE 1865, a new system was devised and adopted, known as the "Great Sun of Discovery" (GSD). The first year of the system, known as GSD 1, was the year that Christopher Columbus arrived in the Americas, namely AD 1492. In this system, years were known as "great suns" and months were called "moons", each with their own epithet, e.g. "Cold Moon" for January, but the length of these years and months conformed to the conventional Gregorian calendar.

Philanthropy and positions 

The order has historically opposed federal welfare programs, waste in government and Communism. However, there are examples of substantial socialist participation in the organization in pockets of the United States; for example, in southern West Virginia, during the build up to the West Virginia Mine Wars, "the Improved Order of Red Men [was] . . . the most comfortable lodge for Socialist miners and other radical workers."

After the Civil war in West Virginia, the Improved Order of Red Men became a fraternal organization of some notoriety for vigilante activity. The Red Men Act, West Virginia's anti conspiracy law, was passed in response to a groundswell of such violence. Occasionally this vigilante activity included the use of red masks over their faces.

The IORM supported the founding of the Society of American Indians in 1911 and helped organize the SAI's first two conferences.

Offshoots

Independent Order of Red Men 
In 1850, the German-language, "Metamora Tribe of Baltimore", refused to pay a benefit, even though the Great Councils of Maryland and the United States decided that it was legal and proper for them to do so. The group then surrendered its charter and formed a new, German-speaking Independent Order of Red Men. It asked the other German-language groups (or Stamms) to join the new group, but few did so. The Independent Order had a height of 12,000 members, though in the 1880s many Stamms returned to the Improved Order. It still existed in 1896, but according to Albert C. Stevens it gave "no sign of vigorous growth". In the early 1920s, Arthur Preuss could not get into contact with them, but felt it probably still existed.

Afro-American Order of Red Men 
In 1904, another group called the Independent Order of Red Men emerged in Virginia, this time composed entirely of African Americans. When the Improved Order objected to the use of the name, the leader of the group, R. M. Spears, had the charter withdrawn and renamed the group the "Afro-American Order of Red Men and Daughters of Pocahontas". The Virginia IORM still apparently considered an injunction against the new group, but it is unclear how the episode turned out. A Tribe #23 based in Metompkin, Virginia is attested by the existence of a ribbon badge in the collection of Theda Skocpol, suggesting that the group had at least 23 local "tribes" in the state. The badge is identical to the ones worn by the IORM, except with the AAORM initials.

Notable members 
 Warren G. Harding
 Albert Dutton MacDade
 John Buchanan Robinson
 Theodore Roosevelt
 Franklin D. Roosevelt
 Alben W. Barkley

Gallery

Notes and references

Bibliography

External links 
Improved Order of Red Men official site
Official History of the Improved Order of Redmen 1893
Guide to The Great Council of Kentucky of the Improved Order of Red Men record, 1905-1968 housed at the University of Kentucky Libraries Special Collections Research Center

 
1813 establishments in Pennsylvania
Men's organizations in the United States
Organizations established in 1813
Secret societies in the United States